Shi Zhiyong (born February 10, 1980, in Longyan, Fujian) is a Chinese weightlifter. He became Olympic Champion during the 2004 Summer Olympics. He lifted a total of 325 kg, equalising the World record at that time.

Shi participated in the men's 69 kg class at the 2005 and 2006 World Weightlifting Championships. He won gold in 2005 and silver in 2006, finishing behind Vencelas Dabaya. He snatched 150 kg and jerked an additional 177 kg for a total of 327 kg, 5 kg behind winner Dabaya.

Shi Zhiyong held the world record in the 62 kg class with 153 kg in snatch for 12 years.
He also holds the world junior records in the 62 kg class with 152 kg in snatch, and with 322 kg in total.

Major results

References 

 

1980 births
Living people
Olympic gold medalists for China
Olympic weightlifters of China
People from Longyan
Weightlifters at the 2004 Summer Olympics
Weightlifters at the 2008 Summer Olympics
Place of birth missing (living people)
World record setters in weightlifting
Olympic medalists in weightlifting
Asian Games medalists in weightlifting
Weightlifters from Fujian
Weightlifters at the 2002 Asian Games
Weightlifters at the 2006 Asian Games
Medalists at the 2004 Summer Olympics
Chinese male weightlifters
Asian Games silver medalists for China
Medalists at the 2006 Asian Games
World Weightlifting Championships medalists
21st-century Chinese people